Broken English is the seventh studio album by English singer Marianne Faithfull. It was released on 2 November 1979 by Island Records. The album marked a major comeback for Faithfull after years of drug abuse, homelessness, and suffering from anorexia. It is often regarded as her "definitive recording" and Faithfull herself described it as her "masterpiece".

Broken English was Faithfull's first major release since her album Love in a Mist (1967). After ending her relationship with Mick Jagger in 1970 and losing custody of her son, Faithfull's career went into a tailspin as she suffered from heroin addiction and lived on the streets of London. Severe laryngitis and drug abuse during this period permanently altered Faithfull's voice, leaving it cracked and lower in pitch. She attempted a comeback in 1976 with Dreamin' My Dreams, which achieved only minor success. Shortly afterwards, Faithfull began working with musician Barry Reynolds, who produced the songs "Broken English" and "Why D'Ya Do It?". The demos attracted the attention of Chris Blackwell who signed Faithfull to his record label Island Records.

The album was recorded at Matrix Studios in London. Faithfull collaborated with producer Mark Miller Mundy on the remaining songs for the album. After the whole album was recorded, he suggested making the music "more modern and electronic" and brought in Steve Winwood on keyboards. Musically, Broken English is a new wave rock album with elements of other genres, such as punk, blues and reggae.

Broken English received critical acclaim. It peaked at number 82 on the Billboard 200, becoming her first album to chart in the United States since Go Away from My World (1965) and giving Faithfull a first nomination for the Grammy Award for Best Female Rock Vocal Performance. It reached number 57 in the United Kingdom and entered the top five in Germany, France and New Zealand. Broken English was certified platinum in Germany and France and sold over one million copies worldwide. Two singles were released from the album, with "The Ballad of Lucy Jordan" peaking at number 48 on the UK Singles Chart. The album was included on NME magazine's list of "500 Greatest Albums of All Time" and in the book 1001 Albums You Must Hear Before You Die.

Background
Faithfull's immediately preceding albums, Dreamin' My Dreams and Faithless, had been in a relatively gentle folk or country and western style. Broken English was a radical departure, featuring a contemporary fusion of rock, punk, new wave and dance, with liberal use of synthesizers. After years of cigarette smoking and drug use, Faithfull's voice was in a lower register, far raspier, and had a more world-weary quality than in the past that matched the often raw emotions expressed in the newer songs.

The backing band of Barry Reynolds, Joe Mavety (guitars), Steve York (bass) and Terry Stannard (drums) had been formed in 1977 to tour Ireland with Faithfull promoting Dreamin' My Dreams.

Marianne Faithfull recounted how Mark Mundy was brought on as the album's producer: "I don't think I could have handled Broken English without a producer. You can't imagine what it was like. There I am with no respect at all within the music business. ... So I found somebody who wanted the break, and that was Mark Mundy. He wanted to be a record producer, and he had some great ideas."

Composition
The album's title track took inspiration from terrorist figures of the time, particularly Ulrike Meinhof of the Baader-Meinhof group. "Guilt" was informed by the Catholic upbringing of the singer and her composer Barry Reynolds. "The Ballad of Lucy Jordan", originally performed by Dr. Hook & the Medicine Show, is a melancholy tale of middle class housewife's disillusionment; Faithfull's version became something of an anthem and was used on the soundtracks to the films Montenegro (1981) and Thelma & Louise (1991). "What's the Hurry?" was described by Faithfull as reflecting the everyday desperation of the habitual drug user. Her cover of John Lennon's "Working Class Hero" was recorded as a tribute to her own heroes such as Mick Jagger and Keith Richards, David Bowie and Iggy Pop, and Lennon himself.

The last track, the six-and-a-half-minute "Why'd Ya Do It?", is a caustic, graphic rant of a woman reacting to her lover's infidelity. The lyrics began with the man's point of view, relating the bitter tirade of his cheated-on lover. It was set to a grinding tune inspired by Jimi Hendrix's recording of Bob Dylan's "All Along the Watchtower". Poet and writer Heathcote Williams had originally conceived the lyrics as a piece for Tina Turner to record, but Faithfull succeeded in convincing him that Turner would never record such a number. Its plethora of strong profanity and explicit references to oral sex (which earned the album a “Parental Advisory” label on some versions) caused controversy and led to a ban in Australia. Local pressings omitted the track and instead included a 'bonus' 7" single of the extended version of "Broken English" . The ban did not extend to import copies, and the song was also played unedited on the Government-funded Double Jay radio station and Brisbane community broadcaster 4ZZZ. It wasn't until 1988 when Island re-released the album in Australia that "Why D'Ya Do It" was finally included.

Release and promotion
The deluxe reissue was conceived and compiled by Andrew Batt. It was released in a cardboard sleeve and features the original album remastered by Jared Hawkes with the first disc consisting only of the original album along with a 12-minute music video directed by Derek Jarman. The film was designed to be shown in theaters and had never been released for home video before.

The second disc features the original mix of the album which, in some cases, sound quite a bit different and, in the case of "Why'd Ya Do It" runs nearly two minutes longer than the album version. Supplemented by single edits, 7, 12 inch remixes and Faithful's re-recorded version of "Sister Morphine", which had previously appeared on a 12-inch release, the second disc with the original mix was Faithful's preferred mix of the album. The original mix receives its release for the very first time as part of this reissue.

The spoken word track "The Letter" (not to be confused with the song by The Box Tops and Joe Cocker) which has Marianne recite the 'It Was Not My Fault' letter from the French novel Les Liaisons dangereuses was not included.  Although the track did appear in some countries on the b-side of the 1982 Island anniversary 12 inch remix/re-issue of "Broken English" it was left off the deluxe edition because it was recorded as the introduction of an extended video for "Intrigue" from Marianne's next album Dangerous Acquaintances the title of which was the literal translation of Les Liaisons dangereuses.

The 24 page booklet includes numerous photos from the cover session by Dennis Morris, and examples of the various sleeves and album cover variations that appeared in different countries.

Critical reception

Faithfull notoriously performed the title track and "Guilt" on Saturday Night Live in February 1980 where her voice cracked and she seemingly strained to even vocalize at times. This less-than-perfect performance, which some have called one of the worst on the live show, has been attributed to everything from her continuing drug use to her nervousness due to her former lover Mick Jagger making contact with her right before the performance. The show was hosted by Chevy Chase. In 1981, Marianne Faithfull was nominated for the Grammy Award for Best Female Rock Vocal Performance for this album.

Singles

Broken English made #57 in the UK album charts and #82 in the US. "The Ballad of Lucy Jordan" was released as a single simultaneously with the LP in October 1979. The title track was issued as a single in January 1980. Faithfull included five tracks from the album on her 1990 live recording Blazing Away: "Broken English", "Guilt", "The Ballad of Lucy Jordan", "Working Class Hero" and "Why D'Ya Do It". In 1996, "Witches' Song" was covered by Juliana Hatfield for the soundtrack of the film The Craft.

An extended remix of the title track (5:46) was released on 12" vinyl in 1979 and included as a bonus 7" with the Australian pressing. An unofficial remix produced by Baron von Luxxury led to the song being re-added to numerous DJ playlists, including  BBC Radio 1, in early 2008.

Track listing

Notes

 "Why D'Ya Do It" was omitted for a 7" vinyl of the extended version of "Broken English" on the original Australian pressings of the album.

Personnel
 Marianne Faithfull – vocals
 Barry Reynolds – guitar
 Joe Mavety – guitar
 Guy Humphries – guitar
 Steve York – bass
 Darryl Way – violin
 Steve Winwood – keyboards
 Jim Cuomo – saxophone
 Terry Stannard – drums
 Morris Pert – percussion
 Dyan Birch - background vocals
 Frankie Collins - background vocals
 Isabella Dulaney - background vocals

Technical
 Bob Potter – engineer, mixing
 Ed Thacker – mixing engineer
 Dennis Morris – sleeve photography
 Mark Miller Mundy - arrangement and production

Charts

Weekly charts

Year-end charts

Certifications and sales

References

Bibliography
 Marianne Faithfull with David Dalton (1994). Faithfull: An Autobiography

External links
 [ Broken English] at AllMusic
 

1979 albums
Marianne Faithfull albums
Island Records albums
New wave albums by English artists